Isaac "Ike" Schlossbach (c. August 20, 1891 – August 1984) was an American polar explorer, submariner and aviation pioneer.

He was born in Bradley Beach, New Jersey and raised in Neptune Township, New Jersey where he attended Neptune High School.

Military career
In 1911, Schlossbach became the first Jewish midshipman at the United States Naval Academy in Annapolis, Maryland, winning letters in football and wrestling.  He graduated from the Naval Academy in 1915 and volunteered to go to the first submarine school. During World War I, he commanded submarines in the Mediterranean.

In 1921, after the end of the war, Schlossbach joined the aviation branch of the United States Navy. He was first to be sent to lighter-than-air flying school (dirigibles).  In 1922, he learned to fly fixed-wing aircraft.  By 1925, then Lieutenant Commander Schlossbach was leading an aero squadron. He first commanded the squadron that flew the record South American flight, and then the first squadron to serve on the first aircraft carrier, .

Schlossbach had trouble with his left eye, and the Navy assigned him to the Naval Academy, teaching engineering and aviation and coaching the football team. In 1930 at the age of 38, Lieutenant Commander Schlossbach was forced to retire from the Navy on a medical discharge when he lost his eye.

Just before U.S. entry into World War II, Schlossbach headed a small radio/meteorological team that founded the airport at Fort Chimo (Crystal I) in Labrador on 10 October 1941. Out of retirement, he further distinguished himself while assigned to Guadalcanal.

Arctic and Antarctic exploration
Schlossbach went on twelve polar expeditions, three to the Arctic and nine to the Antarctic.  He was on the Wilkins Trans-Arctic Expedition in 1931 and served as navigator on USS Nautilus, the first attempt to take a submarine to the North Pole under the icepack. He commanded Admiral Richard Byrd's ship, Bear of Oakland, and was a pilot on Byrd's Second Antarctic Expedition (1933–35). He was the second in command on the MacGregor Arctic Expedition (1937–38) where he accomplished a number of polar aviation firsts. In 1939, he accompanied Byrd again to the Antarctic on the United States Antarctic Service Expedition.

After World War II, Schlossbach was second in command on the last privately funded Antarctic expedition, the 1946–1948 Ronne Antarctic Research Expedition. He commanded the 1200-ton diesel-powered wooden tug Port of Beaumont, which was frozen into Back Bay through the winter. He also accompanied Finn Ronne to a cape in the Weddell Sea, which was named after him. as is a mountain.

Schlossbach accompanied an Australian research expedition to Ellsworth Station Antarctica in 1955, for which he received a letter of commendation from the Australian government.

In 1956, Admiral Byrd selected Ike as his personal representative on Operation Deep Freeze. Schlossbach accompanied Byrd on several other occasions and made his last trip to the Antarctic as a consultant to the United States Navy in 1961 when he was 70 years old.

He was awarded three Congressional medals for his contributions to Antarctic exploration.

Other accomplishments

Before World War II, Schlossbach founded the Asbury Park Air Terminal, originally known as Schlossbach Field (also known as Gibson Air Academy).

His adventures took him around the world, to the South Pacific, New Zealand, Australia, the Philippines, South America as well as to the Arctic and Antarctica. He never married and died in 1984 at the age of 93.

Timeline

References

 Inglis, Robert: "A Scout Goes North", 1938
 MacGregor, Clifford J.: "Monthly Weather Review", October 1939
 Goodrich, Margaret T (Peggy): "Ike's Travels" 1974
 Sallach, David L.: "NJ Historical Commission Newsletter", February 1977
 Vogel, Hal: "Ice Cap News", Nov–Dec 1977
 Vogel, Hal: "They Brought Their Own Storms", 1977
 Inglis, Robert: "Rutgers University Oral History", 1998
 Ayres, Shirley: "Bradley Beach Library, Summer Newsletter, 2003"

External links
  Abandoned & Little-Known Airfields: Eastern New Jersey
 Nautilus (Submarine) Photograph Collection Note that his name is spelled Schlossback at one point
 Oral History, Robert Inglis
 Summer Newsletter, Bradley Beach Library

1891 births
1984 deaths
American explorers
American Jews
Aviators from New Jersey
Explorers of the Arctic
Explorers of Antarctica
Neptune High School alumni
People from Bradley Beach, New Jersey
People from Neptune Township, New Jersey
United States Naval Aviators
United States Naval Academy alumni
Military personnel from New Jersey